Oleksiy Oleksandrovych Maydanevych (born 18 July 1991) is a Ukrainian professional footballer who plays as a Right-back for KSZO Ostrowiec Świętokrzyski.

Career
Maydanevych is a product of the Obolon-Zmina academy. His first trainer was Hryhoriy Matiyenko. He spent his career as a player of Kyivan teams FC Obolon Kyiv, its phoenix club FC Obolon-Brovar Kyiv, and FC Arsenal-Kyiv Kyiv. In 2019, Maydanevych played for the Georgian second tier FC Shevardeni-1906 Tbilisi.

In November of 2020, Maydanevych was named the Ukrainian First League "Player of the Month".

On 18 September 2022, having already made his debut as a substitute in a 0–4 away league win against Wisła Sandomierz a day prior, it was announced he joined Polish club KSZO Ostrowiec Świętokrzyski. He decided not to extend his short-term deal with the club and left KSZO at the end of the year.

References

External links
 
 

1991 births
Living people
Footballers from Kyiv
Ukrainian footballers
Association football defenders
FC Obolon-Brovar Kyiv players
FC Obolon-2 Kyiv players
FC Bukovyna Chernivtsi players
FC Arsenal Kyiv players
FC Shevardeni-1906 Tbilisi players
KSZO Ostrowiec Świętokrzyski players
Ukrainian Premier League players
Ukrainian First League players
Ukrainian Second League players
Erovnuli Liga 2 players
III liga players
Ukrainian expatriate footballers
Expatriate footballers in Georgia (country)
Ukrainian expatriate sportspeople in Georgia (country)
Expatriate footballers in Poland
Ukrainian expatriate sportspeople in Poland